Drosopigi or "Tserova" (Greek: Τσεροβά) is a small village in Mani, Laconia, Greece. It is part of the municipal unit of Gytheio. Drosopigi has historic towers and because of its stoned houses, it has been declared as a traditional settlement.  

During World War II the Germans who were based at Gytheio bombarded the town with cannon fire. 

Now Drosopigi has a population of around 50 people, based on the most recent demographic. In the summer people  move from cities around Greece to Drosopigi to vacate, spreading life to the village, but off-season Drosopigi seems relatively empty. 

Less than 8km of Drosopigi one of the nicest beaches of Laconia, Skoutari. Two guest houses and one traditional tavern operate in the village and the closest center for shopping, entertainment and night-life is Areopoli. The route Aeropoli - Drosopigi is served by bus three times a week.

Historical population

See also

List of settlements in Laconia

Populated places in Laconia
Populated places in the Mani Peninsula
East Mani